Dwight Hamilton Schofield (born March 25, 1956) is an American former professional ice hockey player. He played in the National Hockey League for six teams between 1977 and 1988.

Dwight currently lives in Brentwood, Missouri, a suburb in St. Louis, and has worked many years as a coach and mentor to the younger players in the youth and High School programs.

Biography
As a youth, Schofield played in the 1968 and 1969 Quebec International Pee-Wee Hockey Tournaments with a minor ice hockey team from Boston.

Selected in 1976 by the Detroit Red Wings of the National Hockey League and the New England Whalers of the World Hockey Association, Schofield also played for the Montreal Canadiens, St. Louis Blues, Washington Capitals, Pittsburgh Penguins, and Winnipeg Jets before he retired following the 1987–88 NHL season.

Schofield primarily played the role of enforcer throughout his professional career, typically assigned to protect his team's scorers. His reputation as a fighter with the Washington Capitals earned him the nickname "Sconan the Barbarian."

Regular season and playoffs

References

External links

Profile at hockeydraftcentral.com

1956 births
Living people
American men's ice hockey defensemen
Baltimore Skipjacks players
Dayton Gems players
Detroit Red Wings draft picks
Detroit Red Wings players
Fort Wayne Komets players
Ice hockey players from Massachusetts
Kalamazoo Wings (1974–2000) players
Kansas City Red Wings players
London Knights players
Maine Mariners players
Milwaukee Admirals (IHL) players
Montreal Canadiens players
New England Whalers draft picks
Nova Scotia Voyageurs players
Sportspeople from Lynn, Massachusetts
Sportspeople from Waltham, Massachusetts
Pittsburgh Penguins players
St. Louis Blues players
Washington Capitals players
Winnipeg Jets (1979–1996) players